Hadramphus pittospori, is a species of weevil in the family Curculionidae. Endemic to New Zealand, it was first described by Guillermo Kuschel in 1987.

References 

Beetles of New Zealand